Club My War (also known as Club My War O)))) is a platform for underground metal and punk bands to play at intimate venues in the greater Los Angeles area, notably Hollywood. Formed in 2009 by Eddie Solis of Southern Lord Records, events are held on a weekly or monthly basis at venues such as The Viper Room, Dragonfly, and Troubadour. Club My War hosted the first U.S. performance of doom metal superband Shrinebuilder, as well as performances by Dave Lombardo's new band Philm, Wolves in the Throneroom, Weedeater, 16, It's Casual, Black Cobra, Municipal Waste, and Torche.

Overview
Club My War is an ongoing weekly or monthly event in the greater Los Angeles area, founded by Eddie Solis of the band It's Casual and Southern Lord Records. The recurring event hosts metal, hardcore punk, stoner rock, drone metal, and skate rock bands in small intimate venues. While Club My War operates at different locations such as The Viper Room, and was a regular event at The Relax Bar in Eastern Hollywood until 2010, when the venue closed. Included among  multiple other venues are the Blue Monkey in Hollywood, East Side Luv in Boyle Heights, and The Dragonfly in Hollywood.

Club My War is frequently documented by music photographer Rick Kosick of Jackass and Big Brother, who started attending shows at The Relax Bar in early 2010.

Notable shows

Shrinebuilder

On November 11, 2009, Club My War arranged and hosted the first live show in the United States by the recently formed doom metal supergroup Shrinebuilder. The band includes Scott "Wino" Weinrich of Saint Vitus and The Hidden Hand, Scott Kelly of Neurosis, Al Cisneros of Om and Sleep, and Dale Crover of the Melvins. The band had formed earlier in 2009, and had released their widely praised debut album Shrinebuilder just the month before. The band played two sets at the Viper Room. The venue and show were praised by Scott Kelly, especially for the intimacy and the "die-hard" mentality of the audience.

Artists
The following is a partial list of artists and bands who have performed at Club My War, all subgenres of metal and punk.

16
Agent Steel
Ancestors
Backwoods Payback
Black Math Horsemen
Behold the Monilith
Black Cobra
Bruce Cambell
Chingalera
The Chuck Dukowski Sextet
Clouds
Crackula
Crom
Dale Nixon's Army
Dead Lazlo's Place
Dog
Eat the Living
Fatso Jetson
Fetus Eaters
Fireball Ministry Listening Party
The Fucking Wrath
Gallery
Groamville (Feat. Pascual Romero)
GFP (ft. Tony Alva)
Gypsy Hawk
Green and Wood
House of Broken Promises
Hallowed Engine
Harassor
Helms Alee
Holy Grail
It's Casual
Jucifer
Lightning Swords of Death
Lozen
Matador
Massengil
The Meatmen
Mountains of Blow
Municipal Waste
Music Hates You
Nighthorse
Of The Horizon
Philm (ft. Dave Lombardo)
Professor
Progeria
Rats Eyes
Rwake
Rtx
Sasquatch
Scott Kelly (acoustic)
Shrinebuilder
The Shrine
Stahl Brothers
SMD
Snake's Alive
Strangled by Strangulation (Feat. Pascual Romero)
Torche
Totimoshi
Warcry
Weedeater
Scott "Wino" Weinrich (acoustic)
White Wizzard
Wolves in the Throne Room

References

External links
Club My War on Facebook
Club My War on YouTube
Club My War documented by Rick Kosick

Recurring events established in 2009